Miasto światłości (The City of Light) is a novel written in 1924 by Mieczysław Smolarski.

The novel entwines the genres of dystopia and catastrophism. The novel relays the end of the world by two natural disasters. The first of which destroys all civilisation, whilst the second, the whole of planet Earth, instigated by the complicity of its own inhabitants. The dystopic literary work warns against imperialism and barbarism as well as uncontrolled technological advancement. The novel's themes include antimilitarism and pacifism, prevalent after World War I.

Novels similar to, and inspired by The City of Light and other of Smolarski's literary works, namely Podróż poślubna Pana Hamiltona (The Honeymoon Trip of Mr. Hamilton, 1928) include: Aldous Huxley's Brave New World, published in 1932. Smolarski argued Huxley plagiarised his work, however the author never addressed these claims. In 1982, claims of plagiarism against Huxley were put up again by Antoni Smuszkiewicz in his book Zaczarowana gra.

References

Polish science fiction novels
Post-apocalyptic novels
Fiction set in 1924
1924 science fiction novels